Jonathan Spottiswoode (born 1964) is a New York based musician, writer, and filmmaker. The son of an American singer and English clergyman, he was raised in London.

His short film "The Gentleman" has been shown at a number of film festivals and in regular rotation on the Independent Film Channel, but he is best known as the front man of the band Spottiswoode & His Enemies.

External links
Biography on Spottiswoode & His Enemies web site
Interview on NPR's Weekend Edition, March 29, 2008

References

1964 births
Living people